Elliot Lindberg (born 13 March 1992) is a Swedish footballer who plays for Väsby United as a defender.

References

External links

Elite Prospects profile 

1992 births
Living people
Association football defenders
IF Brommapojkarna players
Swedish footballers